was a Japanese poet and Buddhist monk of the late Heian and early Kamakura periods. 

He was one of the New Thirty-Six Immortals of Poetry, and many of his poems appear in imperial poetry collections such as the Shinchokusen Wakashū, Shokushūi Wakashū, Shingosen Wakashū, and Shokusenzai Wakashū.

1170s births
1217 deaths
Japanese poets
Matsudono family
People of Heian-period Japan
People of Kamakura-period Japan
13th-century Buddhists
Japanese male poets
Heian period Buddhist clergy
Kamakura period Buddhist clergy